Kopper is a surname. Notable people with this surname include:

 Andres Kõpper (born 1990), Estonian musician
 Eduardo Kopper (born 1965), Costa Rican skier
 Hilmar Kopper (1935–2021), chairman of Deutsche Bank 1989–1997
 Ruy Kopper (1930–2010), Brazilian rower

See also
 Copper (disambiguation)
 Koppers (surname)